

Union generals



The following lists show the names, substantive ranks, and brevet ranks (if applicable) of all general officers who served in the United States Army during the Civil War, in addition to a small selection of lower-ranked officers who received brevets as general officers; while some 1,600 officers received or were nominated for brevets as general officers in the course of the war (or immediately following it for service during the war), only a small selection is listed here; only those who were killed in action, served as department heads within the army, had revoked or incomplete appointments or became U.S. President are listed here.

In addition to their names and ranks, there is a small set of notes after every entry listing Medal of Honor or Thanks of Congress citations, West Point graduation dates, important political or Army offices held, retirements or deaths during the war (whether in action or other means), notable relations, rejections or expiration of appointments, or unique facts pertaining to this article (i.e. youngest general, last surviving general, etc.); for all other information on their lives and accomplishments, please refer to their individual entries.

If available, ranks are followed by the "to rank from" dates (i.e. the date on which the commission is effective) rather than the date of appointment or confirmation, which were generally months if not years later; this is particularly true in the case of brevets, most of which were granted after the war between 1866 and 1869.

Note on abbreviations:
MOH: Medal of Honor
CSA: Confederate States Army
DOW: Died of wounds
GAR: Grand Army of the Republic
KIA: Killed in action
MOLLUS: Military Order of the Loyal Legion of the United States
USA: United States Army (Regular Army) (appointment or brevet)
USMA: United States Military Academy
USN: United States Navy
USV: United States Volunteers (appointment or brevet)
VRC: Veteran Reserve Corps officer

A

B

C

D

E

F

G

H

I

J

K

L

M

N

O

P

Q

R

S

T

U

V

W

Y

Z

See also

 List of American Civil War brevet generals (Union)
 List of American Civil War generals (Confederate)
 List of American Civil War generals (Acting Confederate)
 General officers in the Confederate States Army
 General officers in the United States
 Bibliography of Ulysses S. Grant
 Bibliography of the American Civil War

References

 Boatner, III, Mark M., The Civil War Dictionary. David McKay Company, Inc., New York, 1959. .
 Eicher, John H., and Eicher, David J., Civil War High Commands, Stanford University Press, 2001. .
 Faust, Patricia L., ed., Historical Times Illustrated Encyclopedia of the Civil War. Harper & Row, Publishers, Inc., New York, 1986. .
 Hattaway, Herman and Jones, Archer, How the North Won. University of Illinois Press, Urbana, 1983. .
 Heitman, Francis Bernard, Historical register and dictionary of the United States Army: from its organization, September 29, 1789, to March 2, 1903. Government Printing Office, Washington, DC, 1903. 
 Hunt, Roger D. and Brown, Jack R., Brevet Brigadier Generals in Blue. Olde Soldier Books, Inc., Gaithersburg, MD, 1990. ;
 McPherson, James M., Battle Cry of Freedom. Oxford University Press, New York, 1988. .
 Nevins, Allan, The War for the Union, Volume 1, The Improvised War, 1861–1862. Charles Scribner's Sons, New York, 1959. .
 Rodenbough, Theophilus F. and Haskin, William L., ed., The Army of the United States. Maynard, Merrill, & Co., New York, 1896. Argonaut Press Ltd.; Reprint edition (1966). ASIN: B000ST7S9Y.
 Sifakis, Stewart, Who Was Who in the Civil War. Facts On File, New York, 1988. .
 United States War Department, The Military Secretary's Office, Memorandum Relative to the General Officers in the Armies of the United States During the Civil War, 1861–1865, (Compiled from Official Records.) 1906. https://archive.org/details/memorandumrelati05unit, retrieved August 5, 2010.
 United States War Department, The Military Secretary's Office, Memorandum relative to the general officers appointed by the President in the armies of the Confederate States--1861-1865 (1908) (Compiled from official records). Caption shows 1905 but printing date is February 11, 1908. https://archive.org/details/memorandumrelati01unit, retrieved August 5, 2010.
 Warner, Ezra J., Generals in Blue. Louisiana State University Press, Baton Rouge, 1964. .
 Warner, Ezra J., Generals in Gray. Louisiana State University Press, Baton Rouge, 1959. .
 American Civil War Generals, accessed February 18, 2008
 Brevet Union Generals of the Civil War, accessed February 18, 2008
 Confederate Generals from West Point, accessed February 18, 2008
 The Brevet Generals of the American Civil War, accessed from Archive.org, April 9, 2009
 The Generals of the American Civil War, accessed from Archive.org, April 9, 2009
 https://web.archive.org/web/20080306062513/http://sunsite.utk.edu/civil-war/wpungen.html

Lists of American military personnel
Lists of generals
American union